Juan Zambudio Velasco, (born 21 November 1921 in La Alquería, Murcia -  died 21 January 2004 in Igualada, Barcelona) was a Spanish football goalkeeper. He played for Mollet and FC Barcelona. He retired playing in CE Sabadell FC.

He was contracted by FC Barcelona in 1942, when he was 21. He used to play wearing a cap, because the winter matches were scheduled at 3 p.m., in order to use natural light. He was the official goalkeeper of FC Barcelona until he got injured in his eyes. When he was recovered, his place in the goal was strongly held by Antoni Ramallets, and he never got back to the main place.

In 1954 he left FC Barcelona to play in CE Sabadell FC, where he retired one season later. After retiring, he worked as the CE Sabadell FC coach.

He played with the Spanish B selection officially.

Honours
FC Barcelona
Spanish League: 1944–45, 1947–48, 1949–49, 1951–52, 1952–53
Spanish Cup: 1950–51, 1951–52, 1952–53
Latin Cup: 1949, 1952
Copa Eva Duarte: 1948, 1952, 1953
Zamora Trophy: 1947–48

External links
 
 FC Barcelona archives 
 FC Barcelona profile

1921 births
2004 deaths
Spanish footballers
Footballers from the Region of Murcia
Association football goalkeepers
La Liga players
FC Barcelona players
CE Sabadell FC footballers
Spain B international footballers
Catalonia international guest footballers
Spanish football managers
CE Sabadell FC managers
UE Sants managers